Jimmy Connors and Brian Gottfried were the defending champions but did not compete that year.

Heinz Günthardt and Peter McNamara won in the final 7–5, 6–4 against Pavel Složil and Ferdi Taygan.

Seeds
Champion seeds are indicated in bold text while text in italics indicates the round in which those seeds were eliminated.

Draw

Final

Top half

Bottom half

External links
 1981 Volvo International Doubles draw

Doubles